The Cork Defence Union was a non-sectarian and non-political organisation established in Cork, Ireland, October 1885 to ‘unite together all friends of law and order of all classes in this country in a body for their mutual defence and protection’.
 
The Union was opposed to Home Rule and the National League. Landowners, merchants, farmers, shopkeepers, artisans and labourers united under the presidency of the Earl of Bandon and his assistant Viscount Doneraile to help those who had become victims of the National League boycotting campaign.

References

Unionism in Ireland